William Silkworth may refer to:

William Duncan Silkworth (1873–1951), doctor specializing in alcoholism
William Sylvester Silkworth (1884–1971), American sharp shooter and stockbroker